Dr. Zhao Feng (born 1961) is a Chinese textile specialist with a special interest in Silk Road textiles. Dr. ZHAO has been devoted to working in China National Silk Museum for more than 30 years, and become the Director of China National Silk Museum (NSM) since 2009. His research interests mainly focus on interdisciplinary research on textiles and cultural exchange along the Silk Roads. In his tenure, he has transformed the NSM into a leading center for the preservation, study, and appreciation of silk as a significant art medium, and has developed the museum as a “research-oriented, conservation-cycled, international-targeted and fashion-conscious (Chinese: 研究型，全链条，国际化，时尚范)”  institution.

Education 
Born in 1961, Zhao studied at the Zhejiang Institute of Silk Textile (now Zhejiang Sci-Tech University), earning a BA in Dyeing and Finishing (1978–82) and MA in Chinese Silk History (1982–84). He did his PhD in Textile History of China, at the China Textile University (now Donghua University) (1995-1997), a student of Zhu Xinyu 朱新予 and Jiang Youlong 蒋猷龙.

Career 
Zhao remained at the Zhejiang Institute of Silk Textile as an assistant researcher. In 1991, he became curator and researcher at the China National Silk Museum, and has remained with this museum since, with long periods overseas as a visiting researcher, studying Chinese textiles in museums around the world: at the Metropolitan Museum of Art (1997–98), Royal Ontario Museum (1999), and British Museum (2006). He also holds the following positions in Chinese and international organisations: Director of Chinese Textiles Identification Protection Center; professor and PhD supervisor of Donghua University; member of the National Committee of Cultural Relics; council member of Centre International d'Etude des Textiles Anciens (CIETA); director of Dunhuang Studies of Zhejiang province; representative of 11th National People's Congress; one of Zhejiang Provincial “Super Experts”; director of Key Scientific Research Base of Textile Conservation, SACH. In 2015 he proposed the founding of the International Association for the Study of Silk Road Textiles, and became its first President.

Selected Academic Appointments 
Guest Researcher, W. F. Albright Institute of Archaeological Research, Jerusalem, Israel, January 2017 
Catalog Writer, China: Dawn of a Golden Age (200-750 AD), Metropolitan Museum of Art, New York, 2014 
Guest Lecturer, City University of Hong Kong, Hong Kong, January 2008 and 2009 
Guest Researcher with the grant from the British Academy, worked on the textiles in Aurel Stein's collection, British Museum, London, 2006 
The Veronika Gervers Memorial Fellowship, Royal Ontario Museum, Toronto, February 1999 
The Sylvan and Pamela Coleman Fellowship, Metropolitan Museum of Art, New York, 1997–1998
Catalog Writer, China: 5,000 Years, Guggenheim Museum of Art, New York, 1997

Other Current Positions 
President of Costume and Design Museum Committee in Chinese Museums Association/ ICOM-China, since 2021
Guest Researcher of ICOM International Museums Research and Exchange Center (ICOM-IMREC), since 2021 
Member of Ethics Committee of International Council of Museums (ETHCOM), since 2020 
Professor and Doctoral Supervisor of Textile Conservation in Zhejiang Sci-Tech University, since 2019 
Vice President of International Alliance of Museums of the Silk Road Board (IAMS), since 2017 
Vice Chairman of International Silk Union Board (ISU), since 2016 
President of International Association for the Study of Silk Road Textiles (IASSRT), since 2016 
Board Member of ICOM-China, since 2014
Editorial Board Member of Textile History, London, since ca. 2010 
Member of National Committee for Cultural Relics Authentication and Preservation in China, since 2005 
Professor and Doctoral Supervisor of Textiles and Costume History in Donghua University, Shanghai, since 2000
Directing Council Member, Centre International d’Etude des Textiles Anciens (CIETA), since 1998

Research 
Zhao's research is in the history of Chinese silk; identification and conservation of textile relics; cultural communication between China and the world along the Silk Road. He has published extensively in both Chinese and English.

Selected publications 
2022 Research Museum: Development Path of China National Silk Museum, Zhejiang University Press, Zhejiang, China. 
2020 Chinese Silk on Russian Military Flags in Swedish Collection, Zhejiang University Press, Zhejiang, China. 
2019 A World of Looms: Weaving Technology and Textile Arts, Zhejiang University Press, Zhejiang, China. 
2018 Chinese Silks and Silk Road, Royal Collins Publisher, Quebec, Canada. 
2015-2016 Silks from the Silk Road: Origin, Transmission and Exchange (chief ed. English and Chinese), Zhejiang University Press, Zhejiang, China. Won the 2015 National Distinguished Cultural And Museological Book Award. 
2015 Early Chinese Textiles from the Lloyd Cotsen Collection, Cotsen Occasional Press, Los Angeles, USA. 
2014 Global Textile Encounters (ed. with Marie-Louise Nosch and Lotika Varadarajan)
2014 Textiles from Astana and Buzak : with a glossary based on the document from Dunhuang and Turfan (with Wang Le)
2013 Textiles as Money on the Silk Road (with Helen Wang, Valerie Hansen, Masaharu Arakawa, Rong Xinjiang, Angela Sheng, Eric Trombert, Wang Binghua, Wang Le, Xu Chang), special issue of the Journal of the Royal Asiatic Society
2012 Chinese Silks (with Wengying Li, Juanjuan Chen, James C.Y. Watt, Dieter Kuhn, Nengfu Huang, Hao Peng) (Yale University Press)
2007-ongoing—The Textiles from Dunhuang Project to research and publish all textiles from Dunhuang has resulted in three publications so far, of which Zhao is the editor-in-chief: Textiles from Dunhuang in UK Collections,Textiles from Dunhuang in French Collections and Textiles from Dunhuang in Russian Collections.
2004 Style from the steppes : silk costumes and textiles from the Liao and Yuan periods 10th to 13th century (with Anne E Wardwell; Mark Holborn; Donald Dinwiddie; Barbara Mathes Gallery)

References

External links
Zhao Feng on “Rethinking Textile Conservation”, ICCROM Lecture Series  
Zhao Feng on “Chinese Textiles from the Silk Road”, The Cleveland Museum of Art 
Feng Zhao (China National Silk Museum), “The Silk Road Exhibitions in the MET” Video 
Dr. Feng Zhao Topics in Conservation, Smithsonian Institution  
Zhao Feng on Worldcat
Textile Archaeology on the Silk Road: Comparison of textiles found in Northwest China and Israel - lecture by Zhao Feng, 2017
Official website of the China National Silk Museum
Interview with Zhao Feng in HALI Magazine 194

1961 births
Directors of museums in China
Chinese art historians
Silk Road
Living people
Donghua University alumni
Academic staff of Donghua University
People from Haining
Historians from Zhejiang
Writers from Jiaxing
People's Republic of China historians
Educators from Jiaxing
Textile historians